Megalotica is a genus of moths in the family Geometridae described by Zimmerman in 1958.

Species
Megalotica aphoristis (Meyrick, 1899)
Megalotica holombra (Meyrick, 1899)

References

Larentiinae